The Two Parachutists or I due parà is a 1965 Italian war comedy film directed by Lucio Fulci, starring the comic duo Franco and Ciccio.

Plot
Franco and Ciccio are two Sicilian street artists who are forced to flee to the America to escape their debts. There they are immediately drafted, since the Second World War has just broke out. Becoming experienced skydivers, Franco and Ciccio are sent on a secret mission to Germany to ascertain the current situation in some Nazi concentration camps. The two bumbling friends are captured, but rescued almost immediately by the Americans who send them on a new mission. They must parachute into Saudi Arabia to investigate a terrorist plot, and wind up getting into trouble in the Sultan's palace.

Cast
Franco Franchi	... 	Franco Impallomeni
Ciccio Ingrassia	... 	Ciccio Impallomeni
Umberto D'Orsi	... 	American ambassador
Roberto Camardiel	... 	Gen. Jose Limar
Mónica Randall	... 	Rosita
Luis Peña	... 	Alvardo Garcia
Ignazio Leone	... 	Parachutist Sarge Sullivan
Enzo Andronico	... 	Cafe owner
Lino Banfi	... 	Tequinho (as Pasquale Zagaria)
Luciano Bonanni	... 	Villager with the rifles
Franco Morici	... 	Parachute lieutenant
Emilio Rodríguez	... 	Diego
Tano Cimarosa	... 	Garcia's aide
Francesca Romana Coluzzi	... 	Passion Flower
Piero Morgia    ...  Parachutist Jack
Linda Sini ... Consuelo
Calogero Azaretto ... Limar's private

References

External links
 

Films directed by Lucio Fulci
Films scored by Piero Umiliani
1965 films
1960s Italian-language films
Italian war comedy films
Military humor in film
Skydiving in fiction
Italian buddy comedy films
1960s buddy comedy films
1960s war comedy films
1965 comedy films
Italian World War II films
1960s Italian films